Suzanne Roquette (30 August 1942 – 28 May 2020) was a German actress. She is best known for her role as Main Mission Operative Tanya Alexander in Year One of the science fiction television series Space: 1999. Space: 1999 costar Prentis Hancock noted her death on Facebook on May 29, 2020 and Nick Tate memorialized Suzanne on his Facebook page on May 30.

Filmography

Films

Selected TV credits

References

External links 

1942 births
2020 deaths
German film actresses
German television actresses